Anastasiya Tkachuk (born 20 April 1993) is a Ukrainian middle-distance runner. She competed in the 800 metres event at the 2015 World Championships in Athletics in Beijing, China.

References

External links

1993 births
Living people
Ukrainian female middle-distance runners
World Athletics Championships athletes for Ukraine
Place of birth missing (living people)
Athletes (track and field) at the 2010 Summer Youth Olympics
Athletes (track and field) at the 2016 Summer Olympics
Olympic athletes of Ukraine